Situation Dangerous is the second studio album by the supergroup Bozzio Levin Stevens, featuring drummer Terry Bozzio, bassist Tony Levin and guitarist Steve Stevens. It was released on August 8, 2000 by Magna Carta Records.

Track listing

Personnel
Steve Stevens – guitars, engineering, production
Tony Levin – Chapman stick, bass guitar, production
Terry Bozzio – drums, percussion, production
Marcus Nand – acoustic guitar (track 7)
R. Chris Murphy – engineering, production
Annette Cisneros – engineering
Erich Gobel – engineering
David Townson – digital editing
Terry Brown – mixing
Ken Lee – mastering

References

External links
Bozzio/Levin/Stevens "Situation Dangerous" album review at Guitar Nine

Bozzio Levin Stevens albums
Steve Stevens albums
Tony Levin albums
2000 albums
Magna Carta Records albums